The Boulder Valley School District No. Re2 is a school district in Colorado, headquartered in the BVSD Education Center in unincorporated Boulder County, near Boulder. The district serves Boulder, Gold Hill, Jamestown, Lafayette, Louisville, Nederland, Superior, and Ward. Its area also includes portions of Broomfield and Erie.

The Boulder Valley Board of Education officially appointed Rob Anderson to be the superintendent on July 1, 2018. Anderson previously was the Deputy Superintendent of Academics in the Fulton County School System. Anderson has been an educator since 1997 having previously worked in the State of Florida before Georgia.

Anderson replaced Cindy Stevenson, the ex-head of Jefferson County Public Schools, who had been hired as the interim superintendent on June 19, 2017.  Stevenson succeeded Bruce K. Messinger who was fired on May 9, 2017 over unspecified complaint.

Boulder Valley is known for being one of the highest paying districts in the state of Colorado. In 2018, teachers in the district were reportedly paid 45 percent above the state average. The average teacher salary was $75,000.

History
Prior to the School District Organization Act of 1957 passed by the Colorado Legislature, Boulder County was served by multiple local school districts. The consolidation of many smaller districts resulted from the Act and by 1960, Boulder County was served by two reorganized school districts. Boulder Valley School District RE-2 serves the southern half of the county; Saint Vrain Valley School District RE-1J, the northern half. One of Boulder Valley's oldest schools, Whittier International Elementary School, is the oldest continuously-operating school in Boulder County. In 1882, the school opened under the name "the Pine Street School" but was later renamed  “Whittier” after the poet John Greenleaf Whittier, who kept a correspondence with the students.

Community programs
Community courses and extended day care opportunities are provided to district residents by Community Schools, an organization that uses tuition and facility-use fees for operational expenses. It operates four programs: Lifelong Learning, which offers courses for adults and children; Kindergarten Care, which offers extended child care for kindergarten students, the School Age Program, which offers before and after school programs and summer day camps for elementary school students; and the BVSD Facility Use Program, which makes school facilities available to the public. Other programs offered by BVSD include: Safe Routes to School, which aims to reduce traffic congestion around schools and promote healthy lifestyles; and the Boulder Valley Safe Schools Coalition, which aims to ensure each school is a place where everyone can belong. One of BVSD's values is to "respect the inherent value of each student and incorporate the strengths and diversity of students, families, staff and communities." and supports that value through American Indian education, language support, and a seal of bi-literacy recognition.

Schools
Boulder Valley has 56 schools in total. This includes 8 top ranking high schools in the state of Colorado, according to the US News rankings.

Elementary schools

Middle schools

High school

Bond project
In 2006, $296.8 million was approved for district facility improvements by the voters of the Boulder Valley School District. The bond planned to cover 63 projects. There were several themes formed in respect to the types of fixes needed in each school: improve the physical condition of buildings, educational functionality improvements, replacement schools, safe/healthy/comfortable schools, educational innovation, early childhood education, operational efficiency/functionality, enrollment growth in east county, and energy efficiency/sustainability. There are three phases planned, with the most needed changes in the first phase. The process to identify the needs of each facility was a two year long assessment that included gathering information and public processing. The work included reviewing existing data, onsite inspections, interviews, and committee meetings.

References

External links

School districts in Colorado
School districts established in 1960
Education in Boulder, Colorado
Education in Boulder County, Colorado
Education in Broomfield, Colorado
1960 establishments in Colorado